The 1947–48 Kentucky Wildcats men's basketball team, also known as the Fabulous Five, represented University of Kentucky. The head coach was Adolph Rupp. The team was a member of the Southeast Conference and played their home games at Alumni Gymnasium. 

They won 36 of 39 games in their conference, earning them the 1948 NCAA basketball tournament championship.

NCAA tournament
East
 Kentucky 76, Columbia 53
Final Four
Kentucky 60, Holy Cross 52
Championship
 Kentucky 58, Baylor 42

Awards and honors

Team players drafted into the NBA

Fabulous Five
Though the Fabulous Five referred to the whole team during the 1947-1948 season, five players stood out in particular: Ralph Beard (guard), Alex Groza (center), Wallace "Wah Wah" Jones (forward), Cliff Barker (forward), and Kenny Rollins (guard). Following the successful 1947-1948 season at UK, all five competed as a unit and won gold at the 1948 Summer Olympics in London.
 Rollins graduated but the other four returned for the 1948-1949 season, which they dominated. Coach Rupp then retired the jerseys of Barker, Beard, Groza, Jones, and Rollins.

References

Kentucky Wildcats
Kentucky Wildcats men's basketball seasons
Kentucky
NCAA Division I men's basketball tournament Final Four seasons
NCAA Division I men's basketball tournament championship seasons
1947 in sports in Kentucky
1948 in sports in Kentucky